Ganfried May (born 25 July 1994) is a South African professional rugby union player for the . He is a utility back that can play as a fullback, winger or fly-half.

Rugby career

2011–2012: Schoolboy rugby

May was born in Oudtshoorn. He was named as a replacement for two games in the former, but started all three matches in the latter, scoring a try in their match against Limpopo. He was included in a South Africa Schools squad after the 2012 event for the Under-18 International Series against their counterparts from France, Wales and England, but didn't feature in any of their matches.

2013–2016: Blue Bulls

May moved to Pretoria for the 2013 to join the  academy. He was included in the  squad for the 2013 Under-19 Provincial Championship, and appeared in all fourteen of their matches during the season. He started nine matches during the regular season and was used as a replacement in three other matches, scoring tries in matches against  (in Pretoria),  and Free State U21 in Bloemfontein to help the Blue Bulls to twelve consecutive victory to top the log.

He made eight appearances for the  team during the 2014 Under-21 Provincial Championship, through five starts and three substitute appearances.

In 2015, May was included in the  squad for the 2015 Vodacom Cup competition. He reverted to the U21 team for the second half of the season to make nine appearances in the Under-21 Provincial Championship. He scored four tries – one against , one against  in Pretoria and a brace in their 55–33 victory over the Leopards in Potchefstroom. Overall, it was a disappointing season for the defending champions, as they finished in fifth place on the log, missing out on the semi-final play-offs.

He played amateur club rugby during this time, playing for Naka Bulle in the Carlton League in the region. He was named in the Blue Bulls squad for the 2016 Currie Cup Premier Division, but failed to make any appearances, instead being loaned to the Eastern Province Kings.

2016: Eastern Province Kings

He made his first start four days later as Eastern Province faced  in a rescheduled midweek match, and made his third and final appearance of the season as a replacement in their 25–57 loss to the  three days later. The Eastern Province Kings endured a torrid season, losing all eight of their matches to finish bottom of the log.

References

South African rugby union players
Living people
1994 births
People from Oudtshoorn
Rugby union fly-halves
Rugby union wings
Rugby union fullbacks
Blue Bulls players
Eastern Province Elephants players
Rugby union players from the Western Cape